Alone, Again is a solo piano album by Paul Bley, recorded in Norway in 1974 and released on Bley's own Improvising Artists label in 1975.

Reception

Allmusic awarded the album 3 stars noting "Bley stayed mainly in the piano's center, creating nimble melodies, working off them and crafting alternate directions or intriguing counterpoints. It was intellectual, occasionally stiff, but never dull or detached".

Track listing
All compositions by Paul Bley except where noted.
 "Olhos de Gato" (Carla Bley) - 4:29	
 "Ballade" - 5:54	
 "And Now the Queen" (Carla Bley) - 3:06	
 "Glad" - 5:08	
 "Lovers" - 5:34	
 "Dreams" (Annette Peacock) - 5:57	
 "Explanations" - 6:48

Personnel 
Paul Bley - piano

References 

1975 albums
Paul Bley albums
Improvising Artists Records albums
Solo piano jazz albums